Athyris is a brachiopod genus with a subequally biconvex shell that is generally wider than long and a range that extends from the Silurian into the Triassic. Athyris is the type genus for the Athyrididae, which belongs to the articulate order Athyridida.  R.C. Moore (1952) gives a shorter range, from the Mid Devonian to the Lower Mississippian.

Alverezites, Bruntonites, and Meristospira are among related genera.

Reassigned species 
Some species originally included in Athyris have been reassigned.
 A. aliena = Septathyris aliena
 A. headi = Catazyga
 A. megalotis = Comelicania megalotis
 A. peracuta = Janiceps peracuta
 A. royssii = Cleiothyridina royssii
 A. umbonata = Hindella umbonata

Ecology and taphonomy

Composition: 	low Mg calcite

Entire body: 	yes

Adult length: 	10 to < 100

Adult width: 	10 to < 100

Adult height: 	10 to < 100

Folds: 	minor

Ribbing: 	minor

Spines: 	none

Internal reinforcement: 	none

Locomotion: 	stationary

Attached: 	yes

Life habit: 	low-level epifaunal

Diet: 	suspension feeder

Vision: 	blind

References: Aberhan et al. 2004, Hendy 2009

References

 R.C Moore 1952. Brachiopods, Ch 6. Moore, Lalicker, and Fischer. Invertebrate Fossils, McGraw-Hill.
 Athyris data

Rhynchonellata
Prehistoric brachiopod genera
Early Devonian first appearances
Triassic extinctions
Paleozoic life of Ontario
Paleozoic life of Alberta
Paleozoic life of Manitoba
Paleozoic life of Nunavut
Paleozoic life of Quebec
Paleozoic life of Yukon